Agden is a civil parish in Cheshire West and Chester, England. It contains four buildings that are recorded in the National Heritage List for England as designated listed buildings, all of which are at Grade II. This grade is the lowest of the three gradings given to listed buildings and is applied to "buildings of national importance and special interest". The parish is entirely rural, and all the listed buildings are related to agriculture.

See also
Listed buildings in Dunham Massey
Listed buildings in High Legh
Listed buildings in Little Bollington
Listed buildings in Lymm
Listed buildings in Millington

References

Listed buildings in Cheshire West and Chester
Lists of listed buildings in Cheshire